Paweł Kieszek (born 16 April 1984) is a Polish footballer who plays as a goalkeeper.

After starting out at Polonia Warsaw he went on to spend most of his professional career in Portugal, signing in 2007 with Braga. He also played three years in the Spanish Segunda División, with Córdoba and Málaga.

Club career
Born in Warsaw, Kieszek began his professional career at local Polonia Warsaw in the Ekstraklasa. In January 2006 he was loaned to Greek club Egaleo FC, where he remained until the end of the year; he returned to Polonia, which had been relegated to the second division in his absence, for 2006–07, playing only a few games before getting injured and missing the rest of the season.

Kieszek signed with S.C. Braga in Portugal in June 2007, on a free transfer. He made his debut for his new team on 21 February 2008 in a 0–1 home loss against SV Werder Bremen in the UEFA Cup round of 32, first appearing in the Primeira Liga three days later against S.L. Benfica (1–1).

In January 2009, Kieszek joined Vitória F.C. on loan until the end of the campaign, being relatively used during his spell as the Sadinos managed to retain their top-flight status. Upon his return to Braga, he was a backup to Portuguese international Eduardo.

In July 2010, after an uneventful 2009–10 with Braga – the side finished second, but he only appeared in three matches in that season's Portuguese League Cup, conceding four goals – Kieszek signed a four-year contract with FC Porto, with Braga retaining 50% of his economic rights. In August of the following year, after only four official appearances, he was loaned to Roda JC from the Netherlands.

On 16 June 2014, after two years with former team Setúbal, Kieszek agreed to a two-year deal with G.D. Estoril Praia. On 13 July 2016, after 62 competitive matches, he switched clubs and countries again, joining Spanish Segunda División's Córdoba CF.

On 31 August 2018, as Córdoba's financial situation prevented his registration, Kieszek terminated his contract and moved to fellow league side Málaga CF. He returned to Portugal and its top tier 11 months later, agreeing to a two-year deal at Rio Ave FC.

Club statistics

Honours
Porto
Primeira Liga: 2010–11
Taça de Portugal: 2010–11

References

External links

1984 births
Living people
Polish footballers
Footballers from Warsaw
Association football goalkeepers
Ekstraklasa players
I liga players
Polonia Warsaw players
Wisła Kraków players
Super League Greece players
Egaleo F.C. players
Primeira Liga players
S.C. Braga players
Vitória F.C. players
FC Porto players
G.D. Estoril Praia players
Rio Ave F.C. players
Eredivisie players
Roda JC Kerkrade players
Segunda División players
Córdoba CF players
Málaga CF players
U.D. Leiria players
Poland youth international footballers
Polish expatriate footballers
Expatriate footballers in Greece
Expatriate footballers in Portugal
Expatriate footballers in the Netherlands
Expatriate footballers in Spain
Polish expatriate sportspeople in Greece
Polish expatriate sportspeople in Portugal
Polish expatriate sportspeople in the Netherlands
Polish expatriate sportspeople in Spain